Amphitecna molinae is an endangered species of plant in the family Bignoniaceae. It is found in El Salvador, Honduras, and Nicaragua.

References

molinae
Endangered plants
Taxonomy articles created by Polbot